Alfred-Henri Recoura or Alfred Recoura (30 September 1864 in Grenoble – 6 December 1940 in Paris), was a French architect.

He is best known for his work on the Basilica of the Visitation in Annecy.

Main achievements 

 1908:  in Choisy-le-Roi
 1909: Beau-site villa, 19 Raspail avenue, 18 rue Camille-Flammarion in Juvisy-sur-Orge
 1922-1930:  in Annecy

References 

1864 births
1940 deaths
People from Grenoble
École des Beaux-Arts alumni
Prix de Rome for architecture
19th-century French architects
20th-century French architects